Don Giuseppe Rizzo (22 December 1863 in Alcamo – 17 April 1912 in Alcamo) was an Italian Catholic priest, politician and journalist.

Biography 
Don Rizzo was early challenged in his childhood, as his father was a humble workman and his mother died when he was only three years old. He attended the Royal Gymnasium (high school) in Alcamo, and completed his philosophical and theological studies, at the diocesan seminary of Mazara del Vallo, where he was ordained as a priest, on 22 September 1888.

During the first years of his priesthood, he devoted himself to educating young people. He founded an oratory, dedicated to Saint Francis de Sales, and later the Association of Azione Cattolica "Don Bosco", to give an appropriate social, political, and religious formation to the young.

The association aimed at educating to an open and practical life as a Christian, studying and promoting the activities of Azione Cattolica, useful for the country according to the principles of Christian Democracy, willed by the Pope.

Following his election as a town councilor, he served as a mediator of peace between opposing parties; he trained people to vote freely and disinterestedly and worked for the moralisation of the town administration. Don Rizzo's life was never an easy one: he engaged himself as a banker, journalist, town councilor, and, obviously, a priest.

His activism was not well regarded by the conservatives of that period and so Don Giuseppe was sent to prison, together with many other people, accused of being a subversive and the instigator of the popular uprising in January 1903 owing to the excise, for retail sale, which had become a slavery for people.

On 25 March of the same year, he was declared fully innocent and released. This dramatic experience weakened his body, but not his spirit; in fact, Don Rizzo resumed his activity with greater energy. He started a bank Cassa Rurale ed Artigiana, a farmers cooperative and a consumer cooperative, to help his poor fellow citizens, who had suffered a serious economic crisis caused by the bankruptcy of two local banks (the Banca Segestana of Castellammare del Golfo and the Popolare Cooperativa of Alcamo) and major problems in the agricultural field, due to the Phylloxera. During his life, he always followed the spirit of the Gospel. He died prematurely on 17 April 1912 at the age of 49.

Following a decision by the bank's partners and board of directors in 1995, his ashes rest in the chapel inside the Basilica of Our Lady of the Assumption, built on a plan by the famous architect, professor Paolo Portoghesi, together with Paolo Borghi’s sculptures.

Banking 

In Sicily, a small and motivated group of so-called social priests promoted some initiatives which had a remarkable social impact: their greatest success was the creation of banks that, above all, were willing to distribute agricultural credit.

In those years, access to credit was the Sicilian farmers' greatest problem: they were obliged to appeal to a rescue, an archaic form of anticipation that owners gave to farmers, but with an annual interest up to a level of 50 per cent or, in extreme cases, to usury. This made it very difficult for most farmers to build wealth.

In 1902 the bankruptcy of two local banks in Alcamo brought several people to ruin: it was on that occasion that don Giuseppe Rizzo thought to create the Cassa Rurale and Artigiana, a cooperative bank with the goal of freeing the poor from usury.

From the beginning, Credit Unions have had a close relationship with a territory, linking their history with that of communities, enough to win the appellation of "local bank".
The Banks of Cooperative Credit have structured themselves in a national system called Credit Union.

The Banca Don Rizzo is still active and has about 3,000 partners today growing from the initial 24. The bank has opened 17 branches in several centres of the provinces of Trapani and Palermo.

See also 
 Pope Leo XIII
 Luigi Sturzo
 Christian Democracy (Italy)
 Italian People's Party
 Credit union
 Paolo Portoghesi
 Vincenzo Regina

References

Sources 
Marsala Rosanna: Alle radici del popolarismo: Lo Cascio, Sturzo, Traina; G. Giappichelli Editore
Vincenzo Regina: Don Giuseppe Rizzo politico e giornalista; artigrafichecampo, Alcamo, 2003
Vincenzo Regina: Don Giuseppe Rizzo maestro di spiritualità; artigrafichecampo, Alcamo, 2002
Vincenzo Regina: Don Giuseppe Rizzo e l'azione sociale dei cattolici dal 1860 al 1912; Aracne, 1988

External links 
Tommaso Papa: Memorie storiche del clero di Alcamo; ed. Accademia di studi Cielo d'Alcamo, Alcamo, 1968
http://ricerca.repubblica.it/repubblica/archivio/repubblica/2002/12/15/don-rizzo-il-banchiere-solidale.html?refresh_ce
https://web.archive.org/web/20160806112142/http://www.siciliainformazioni.com/redazione/69868/don-giuseppe-rizzo-un-prete-fuori-dalla-sacrestia
https://web.archive.org/web/20160817102149/http://www.comune.alcamo.tp.it/in-comune/uffici/25-servizi-alla-persona.html
https://web.archive.org/web/20150918004434/http://www.bancadonrizzo.it/banca_donrizzo_rete_bcc.aspx

People from Alcamo
Founders of Catholic religious communities
1912 deaths
1836 births
20th-century Italian politicians
19th-century Italian Roman Catholic priests